Anmolpreet Singh (born 28 March 1998) is an Indian professional cricketer who plays for Punjab. A right-handed batsman, he is a part of the Mumbai Indians squad in the IPL. He made his IPL debut on 19th September 2021 against Chennai Super Kings.

Career
Singh played two matches in the 2014–15 season of Syed Mushtaq Ali Trophy for Punjab and three matches in the 2015 India Under-19 Tri-Nation tournament. In December 2015 he was named in India's squad for the 2016 Under-19 Cricket World Cup.

He made his first-class debut for Punjab in the 2017–18 Ranji Trophy on 6 October 2017. In November 2017, in his third first-class match, he scored 267 runs in the first innings for Punjab against Chhattisgarh. He was the leading run-scorer for Punjab in the 2017–18 Ranji Trophy, with 753 runs in five matches.

In July 2018, Singh was named in the squad for India Blue for the 2018–19 Duleep Trophy. In October 2018, he was named in India A's squad for the 2018–19 Deodhar Trophy. His consistent performances in the Deodhar Trophy resulted in his call-up to the India A limited-overs squad for their tour of New Zealand.

In December 2018, he was bought by the Mumbai Indians in the player auction for the 2019 Indian Premier League.

In August 2019, Singh was named in the India Blue team's squad for the 2019–20 Duleep Trophy. In October 2019, he was named in India C's squad for the 2019–20 Deodhar Trophy. In February 2022, he was bought by the Mumbai Indians in the auction for the 2022 Indian Premier League tournament.

References

Indian cricketers
1998 births
Living people
Punjab, India cricketers
India Blue cricketers
Indian A cricketers 
Cricketers from Patiala